"Beauty Queen" is the second song from Roxy Music's second album, For Your Pleasure.

Musicians
 Andy MacKay - oboe, saxophone
 Bryan Ferry - vocals, keyboards
 Brian Eno - synthesizer, tapes
 Paul Thompson - drums
 Phil Manzanera - guitar
 John Porter - bass

References

Roxy Music songs
1973 songs
Songs written by Bryan Ferry
Song recordings produced by Chris Thomas (record producer)
Song recordings produced by John Anthony (record producer)